Virgin Hill is a hill rising to 665 m west of Carro Pass, James Ross Island. The name derives from "Cerro Virgen de las Nieves" (Virgin of the Snows hill) applied by Argentine Antarctic Expeditions, 1978. A more concise English form of the name has been approved.

References

Hills of Graham Land
Landforms of James Ross Island